
Year 716 (DCCXVI) was a leap year starting on Wednesday (link will display the full calendar) of the Julian calendar. The denomination 716 for this year has been used since the early medieval period, when the Anno Domini calendar era became the prevalent method in Europe for naming years.

Events 
 By place 
 Byzantine Empire 

Arab-Byzantine Wars: Umayyad Caliph Sulayman ibn Abd Al-Malik begins the preparations for his campaign on Constantinople; he orders new ships be built in the port-cities in Palestine, Egypt & Ifriqiya. General Umar ibn Hubayra raids southern Anatolia by sea and conquers Lycia, where another Arab fleet joins him, and they spend winter. As the navy advances, Sulayman sends land armies into Anatolia, which settle at Caesarea.
 Emperor Theodosios III concludes a peace treaty with Kormesiy, son of Tervel of Bulgaria, in an effort to secure support against the Arab invasion in Anatolia (modern Turkey). The treaty recognizes the Bulgarian borders, including the newly gained lands of Zagore (see 705). Theodosios agrees to pay annual tribute, and exchange refugees charged with conspiracy against the legal ruler. Goods can only be imported or exported with a state seal. Bulgarian merchants gain official access to the trade market in Constantinople.

 Europe 
 Battle of Cologne: Charles Martel, mayor of the palace of Austrasia, is defeated by the Neustrians under King Chilperic II and his mayor Ragenfrid near Cologne (now part of Germany), who have invaded Austrasia to impose their will on the competing Frankish factions of Theudoald and Plectrude, the child grandson (and designated heir) and widow respectively of Pepin of Herstal. Simultaneously, Radbod, king (or duke) of the Frisians, attacks Austrasia and allies with the Neustrians. Charles is forced to flee into the mountains of the Eifel (Ardennes).
 Battle of Amblève: Charles Martel defeats his Neustrian and Frisian rivals near Amel (modern-day Belgium). His forces attack the army of Chilperic II and his allies, as they return triumphantly from Cologne. According to the Annals of Metz, Charles uses a feigned retreat to destroy his foes while they are resting, and recovers much of the ransom paid by Plectrude to Chilperic. He will remain undefeated until his death 25 years later.

 Britain 
 Prince Æthelbald returns from Crowland Fens to Mercia, and seizes the throne after the death of his cousin King Ceolred, who had driven him into exile (see 709). He gains hegemony over London, Essex, and all of the English Midlands. By 731, Æthelbald will have subjugated all provinces south of the Humber River under his overlordship.   
 King Osred I of Northumbria is killed in battle, possibly by the Picts in Manau Gododdin (Scotland). He is succeeded by his distant cousin, Coenred.

 Arabian Empire 
 Abd al-Aziz ibn Musa, governor of Al-Andalus (modern Spain), is assassinated on order of Caliph Sulayman ibn Abd al-Malik. He is succeeded by his cousin Ayyub ibn Habib al-Lakhmi, who becomes interim "protector" (wali) for 6 months, and moves the capital to Córdoba, until replaced by Al-Hurr ibn Abd al-Rahman al-Thaqafi.

 Asia 
 Qapaghan Khan, ruler (khagan) of the Second Turkic Khaganate (Central Asia), is killed during a campaign against his rival Toquz Oghuz. His severed head is sent to Chang'an, capital of the Tang Dynasty. Qapaghan is succeeded by his son Inel Khagan.

 By topic 
 Religion 
 Boniface, Anglo-Saxon missionary, leaves England and travels to Frisia (the western parts of the modern-day Netherlands) to assist Willibrord, bishop of Utrecht, in his work to convert the pagan Frisians.

Births 
 Carloman, Frankish mayor of the palace (approximate date)
 Fujiwara no Kiyonari, Japanese nobleman (d. 777)
 Fujiwara no Yoshitsugu, Japanese statesman (d. 777)
 Hiltrud, duchess regent of Bavaria (approximate date; d. 754)
 Sufyan al-Thawri, Muslim scholar and jurist (d. 778)

Deaths 
 July 13 – Rui Zong, emperor of the Tang Dynasty (b. 662)
 Abd al-Aziz ibn Musa, Arab general (or 718)
 Ceolfrith, Anglo-Saxon abbot
 Ceolred, king of Mercia
 Coenred, king of Mercia
 Musa ibn Nusayr, Arab general (b. 640)
 Osred I, king of Northumbria
 Qapaghan Khan, ruler (khagan) of the Turkic Khaganate
 Theodo II, duke of Bavaria (approximate date)
 Winnoc, Welsh abbot (or 717)

References